Chan Kim (born March 24, 1990) is an American professional golfer who currently competes on the Japan Golf Tour.

Early life
Kim was born in Suwon, South Korea, but grew up in Hawaii.

Amateur career
Kim played his college golf at Arizona State University.

He won the 2009 Pacific Coast Amateur.  He was also twice winner of the Arizona Stroke Play Championship.

Professional career
Kim played on the Canadian Tour in 2011. He played on the Challenge Tour in 2013 and the Asian Tour in 2013 and 2014. In 2013, he was runner-up at the Yeangder Tournament Players Championship. He has played on the Japan Golf Tour since 2015.

He won the Mizuno Open on the Japan Golf Tour to earn a spot in the 2017 Open Championship. Earlier that week he earned a qualifying spot to the 2017 U.S. Open. In early July, he won his second Japan Golf Tour event, the Sega Sammy Cup, after a bogey-free final round of 66.

Amateur wins
2007 Hawaii Amateur
2008 Arizona Stroke Play Championship, Thunderbird International
2009 Pacific Coast Amateur
2010 Arizona Stroke Play Championship

Professional wins (8)

Japan Golf Tour wins (8)

 The Japan Open Golf Championship is also a Japan major championship.

Results in major championships
Results not in chronological order in 2020.

CUT = missed the half-way cut
"T" indicates a tie for a place
NT = No tournament due to COVID-19 pandemic

Results in World Golf Championships

1Cancelled due to COVID-19 pandemic

NT = No tournament
"T" = Tied

References

External links

American male golfers
Arizona State Sun Devils men's golfers
Japan Golf Tour golfers
Asian Tour golfers
European Tour golfers
Golfers from Hawaii
American sportspeople of Korean descent
South Korean emigrants to the United States
People from Suwon
1990 births
Living people